Ceylon Manohar ( – 22 January 2018), popular name of A. E. Manoharan (Anthony Pillai Emmanuel Manoharan) also known as Surangani Manohar, was a pop singer and actor. He has played roles in Tamil films and other Sri Lankan Tamil works. Manoharan was 73 when he died in Chennai of age-related ailments.

He is majorly known for the song "Surangani", which attained cult status in the 1970s and 1980s in Tamil Nadu.

Although he is best remembered as a singer, Manohar had his sights set on acting from a very young age. He began acting in plays when he was a student at St John's College in Jaffna in the 1960s. Like many Sri Lankans of his era, Manohar came to India to pursue his higher studies. While he was a BA student in Trichy, he would go regularly to what was then Madras to try and get a role in a film. At that time all he could manage was a minor role in Maanavan, a 1970 film produced by M M A Chinnappa Thevar.

Manohar moved back to Sri Lanka, where he first worked as a teacher and then decided to become a full-time singer. Sri Lankan music was undergoing a major transformation in the early 1970s when Manohar began performing regularly at major venues in the country. He was one of the pioneers of the country's new pop movement, where he combined Baila with elements of contemporary music. He sang with equal ease in Tamil, Sinhala and English

His rendition of Surangani was made popular across the island by Sri Lankan Broadcasting Corporation (formerly Radio Ceylon), which in the 1970s had a loyal fan base in India. As soon as the song became popular in India, Manohar started making regular trips to Madras, and the roles in films came in slowly. It's a shame that music directors in India did not make better use of his singing talents. Manohar got small roles in films that starred some of the giants of Tamil cinema such as his idol Sivaji Ganesan. He would go on to act in Tamil, Telugu, Kannada and Malayalam films, mostly playing the role of a villain. With his long curly hair, moustache and overweight frame, he fit the role of a ‘bad guy’ well at that time.

when he was living in Colombo, the Black July anti-Tamil riots hit the Sri Lankan capital and spread across the island. Manohar moved to India for a while and later shifted base to London, where he worked for the BBC's Tamil service. It would take two and a half decades for Manohar to act in a Malayalam film again, settling for a minor role in the Mammootty film Thuruppugulan.

He made Chennai his permanent home and lived there after he stopped acting. His last few years were spent in and out of hospital and he had to undergo dialysis. Manohar died in the suburbs of Chennai at the age of 74 in 2018.

Filmography

Tamil Movies
Circa 1970 Pasa Nila
1970 Maanavan 
1978 Mangudi Minor
1978 En Kelvikku Enna Bathil 
1978 Manitharil Ithanai Nirangala
1980 Naan Potta Savaal
1980 Guru (1980 film)
1981 Lorry Driver Rajakannu
1983 Neethibathi
1983 Kai varisai
2003 Jay Jay
2005 Thotti Jaya

Telugu Movies
1978 Lawyer Viswanath as Shakha
1980 Mama Allulla Saval as Michael
1980 Adrushtavanthudu
1980 Aarani Mantalu1981 Chattaniki Kallu Levu1985 Jwala as Manohar
1986 Sakkanodu as Charlie

Malayalam Movies
1978 Thacholi Ambu1979 Aavesham1979 Maamaankam 
1979 Kazhukan1980 Sakthi1981 Kolilakkam1981 Thadavara1982  Padayottam
2006 ThuruppugulanSerialsMuhurthaam AnjaliAthipookal Thirumathi Selvam'' (Nandhini's father)

References

External links

Year of birth missing
1940s births
2018 deaths
Malayalam playback singers
Tamil male actors
Tamil playback singers
Male actors in Tamil cinema
Telugu playback singers
Sri Lankan Tamil musicians
Singers from Chennai
20th-century Indian male singers
20th-century Indian singers
21st-century Indian male singers
21st-century Indian singers